Comoranthus is a plant genus native to Madagascar and the Comoro Islands. It contains 3 species:

Comoranthus madagascariensis H.Perrier - western Madagascar
Comoranthus minor H.Perrier - southwestern Madagascar
Comoranthus obconicus Knobl. - Mayotte Island

References

External links
Mayotte, Les Eaux & Forets, Vavalouza, Comoranthus obconicus
African plants database, Conservatoire et Jardin de Botaniques, Ville de Genève, Comoranthus 

Oleaceae genera
Oleeae
Flora of Madagascar
Flora of the Comoros